Martha Alicia Vázquez (born February 21, 1953) is a Senior United States district judge of the United States District Court for the District of New Mexico, and the first woman to be appointed as a federal judge in that state.

Education and career

Born in Santa Barbara, California, Vázquez is an alumna of the University of Notre Dame, where she received her Bachelor of Arts degree in 1975, followed by a Juris Doctor from the Notre Dame Law School in 1978. Following a brief stint with Michigan Migrant Legal Services, she was a public defender in New Mexico from 1979 to 1981, and then entered private practice, in Santa Fe, New Mexico, from 1981 until her appointment to the federal bench in 1993.

Federal judicial service

On August 6, 1993, Vázquez was nominated by President Bill Clinton for the judge seat on the District Court vacated by Santiago E. Campos. She was confirmed by the United States Senate on September 30, 1993, and received her commission on October 1, 1993. She was sworn in on October 6, 1993. She served as chief judge of the court from 2003 to 2010. She assumed senior status on December 31, 2021.

See also
List of Hispanic/Latino American jurists
List of first women lawyers and judges in New Mexico

References

External links

Chambers page of Martha Vázquez.

1953 births
Living people
20th-century American judges
20th-century American women judges
21st-century American judges
21st-century American women judges
American people of Mexican descent
Hispanic and Latino American judges
Judges of the United States District Court for the District of New Mexico
Notre Dame Law School alumni
People from Santa Barbara, California
People from Santa Fe, New Mexico
Public defenders
United States district court judges appointed by Bill Clinton
University of Notre Dame alumni